Pengelley is a surname. Notable people with the surname include:

Ben Pengelley (born 1998), Australian cricketer
Richard Pengelley (born 1960), Australian water polo player

See also
Pengelly (surname)

Surnames of English origin